Spahići is a village in the municipality of Bihać, Bosnia and Herzegovina.

Demographics 
According to the 2013 census, its population was 450.

References

Populated places in Bihać

fr:Spahići
hr:Spahići, Bosnia and Herzegovina